The Tidioute Bridge is a truss bridge that carries Pennsylvania Route 127 across the Allegheny River between Tidioute and Limestone Township in Warren County, Pennsylvania. PA 127 uses the bridge to reach its terminus at U.S. Route 62.

The 1933 structure sits on the piers of a previous 19th-century bridge. It was rehabilitated in 2002 and forms a gateway into the small town of Tidioute.

See also

 List of crossings of the Allegheny River

References

External links
 Tidioute Bridge (Historic Bridges)

Bridges over the Allegheny River
Bridges completed in 1933
Transportation buildings and structures in Warren County, Pennsylvania
Road bridges in Pennsylvania
Steel bridges in the United States
Parker truss bridges in the United States